The 1981 African Women's Handball Championship was the fourth edition of the African Women's Handball Championship, held in Tunisia from 17 to 31 July 1981. It acted as the African qualifying tournament for the 1982 World Women's Handball Championship.

Draw

Preliminary round

Group A

Group B

Knockout stage

Bracket

Fifth place bracket

Fifth place game

Third place game

Final

Final ranking

References

External links
Results on todor66.com

1981 Women
African Women's Handball Championship
African Women's Handball Championship
1981 in Tunisian sport
1981 in African handball
Women's handball in Tunisia
July 1981 sports events in Africa
1981 in African women's sport